BARON.E, also written as Baron/Barone (French for Baron/Baroness), is a Swiss electronic and Indie pop music duo formed in 2019 consisting of Faustine Pochon and Arnaud Rolle. Their debut EP, Jeunesse Dorée, was released on 13 March 2020.

History
BARON.E is composed of Faustine Pochon and Arnaud Rolle, who are both from Fribourg in the French-speaking part of Switzerland. The duo was formed in 2019. They have cited their influence from all forms of rock music as well as contemporary French music. BARON.E sings in French. The duo blends indie pop and electropop genres in their music. After their single Un verre d’ego was listed in the best songs of 2019 by Les Inrocks, BARON.E started to receive international attention.

Their first EP, Jeunesse Dorée, was released on 13 March 2020.

In March 2020 the duo performed on an American tour, including at the 2020 Francophonie Cultural Festival in Washington, D.C. They were set to perform at the Atlanta Francophonie Festival on 25 March 2020, but the performance was cancelled due to the COVID-19 pandemic.

Discography

Extended plays

References 

Indie pop groups
Musical groups established in 2019
Pop music duos
Swiss electronic music groups
Swiss musical duos
Swiss pop music groups
Male–female musical duos
2019 establishments in Switzerland